Bakers Narrows Provincial Park is a provincial park south of Flin Flon in the Northern Region of Manitoba, Canada. It was designated as a provincial park in 1961.

A viewing tower with interpretive signage provides a view of the park and Lake Athapapuskow.

The park is located within the Namew Lake Ecodistrict in the Mid-Boreal Lowland Ecoregion within the Boreal Plains Ecozone.

See also
List of protected areas of Manitoba
List of provincial parks in Manitoba

References

External links

Bakers Narrows Provincial Park Management Plan (2013)
iNaturalist: Bakers Narrows Provincial Park
eBird: Bakers Narrows Provincial Park

Provincial parks of Manitoba
Protected areas established in 1961
1961 establishments in Manitoba
Protected areas of Manitoba